Pura Kencana is a township in Sri Gading, Batu Pahat District, Malaysia.

There will be many phases in future. Currently the phase 1 development of the township area began in the year 2008 and still ongoing.  Pura Kencana is located along Jalan Kluang which is near to Batu Pahat Mall.  This township of 320 hectares will be an integrated well planned, modernise, and act as a metropolis city township in Batu Pahat. It will consist of a shopping mall, fast food drive-through, shop houses, residential area and a lake garden.  Pura Kencana is developed by Genting Property which is part of Genting Group.

This township is under the jurisdiction of Majlis Perbandaran Batu Pahat (MPBP)[1].

See also 
 Bandar Indahpura
 Batu Pahat

Neighbouring towns

Batu Pahat District
Townships in Johor